Queen Jiso (지소태후 ) (? – 574) was a Korean honorary queen and regent. She was the spouse of prince Galmunwang Ipjong (입종 갈문왕) and the queen mother of king Jinheung of Silla.  She acted as Regent during the minority of her son between 540 and 551.

Family 
Grandfather: Jijeung of Silla (437–514) (r. 500–514)
Grandmother: Queen Yeonje of the Park Clan (연제부인박씨)
Father: King Beopheung of Silla (r. 514–540 AD)
Mother:  Queen Kim of the Kim clan (조생부인 김씨)
Spouses:
Galmunwang Ipjong, the son of King Jijeung of Silla
Son: Jinheung of Silla (526–576; reign 540–576)–known as Kim Sammaekjong (김삼맥종), was the 24th monarch of Silla
Son: Kim Sugheuljong (김숙흘종)
Yi Hwarang (이화랑), 4th  Pungwolju
Daughter: Madame Manho (만호태후)
Son-in-law: Crown Prince Dongryun (동륜태자) (? - 572)
Grandson: Jinpyeong of Silla (567? – 632, reign 579 – 632) –was the 26th king of the Silla
Grandson: Jinjeong Gamulwang ( 진정 갈문왕)
Grandson: Jianan Gamulwang (진안 갈문왕)
Kim Isabu (이사부)
Son: Lord Sejong (世宗公 세종공, ?–588), 6th Pungwolju (561-568, 572) 
Daughter: Princess Sukmyeong (숙명궁주) (? - 603)
Son-in-law: King Jinheung of Silla
Grandson: Crown Prince Jeongsuk (정숙태자)
Park Yeong-sil (박영실)
Daughter: Princess Hwanghwa (황화공주)
Daughter: Princess Songhwa  (송화공주
Son-in-law: Galmunwang Bokseung
Grandson: Kim Horim (김호림)
Granddaughter:  Madame Horin ( 호린부인)
Gu Jin (구진)
Daughter: Princess Bomyeong (보명궁주)
Son-in-law: King Jinheung of Silla
Son-in-law:  King Jinji of Silla
Granddaughter: Princess Seok-myeong (석명공주)
Granddaughter: Princess Yang-myeong ( 양명공주
Son-in-law: King Jinpyeong of Silla

Popular culture
 Portrayed by Kim Ji-soo in 2016-2017 KBS2 TV series Hwarang: The Poet Warrior Youth.

References

  Lee, Soyoung; Leidy, Denise Patry (2013). Silla: Korea's Golden Kingdom. [S.l.]: Metropolitan Museum of Art, 

6th-century births
574 deaths
Royal consorts of Silla
6th-century Korean women
6th-century women rulers